Following is  a list of restaurants in Albuquerque, New Mexico:

 Blake's Lotaburger
 Boba Tea Company
 Canteen Brewhouse
 Chillz Frozen Custard
 Dion's
 El Modelo
 Flying Star
 Frontier Restaurant
 Garduño's
 Little Anita's
 Los Pollos Hermanos (pop-up)
 Mac's La Sierra
 Mac's Steak in the Rough
 Sadie's
 Tim's Place
 Tractor Brewing Company
 Twisters

See also
New Mexico breweries
New Mexico wine
Middle Rio Grande Valley AVA

Albuquerque, New Mexico
Restaurants